Porrini is an Italian surname. Notable people with the surname include:

Dino Porrini (born 1953), Italian cyclist
Michael Porrini (born 1989), American basketball player and coach
Sergio Porrini (born 1968), Italian footballer and manager

See also
Porrino (surname)

Italian-language surnames